is an asteroid roughly 60 meters in diameter, classified as a near-Earth object of the Apollo group. It will pass  of Earth on March 25, 2023. This is a little less than half the distance to the Moon. As of March 20, 2023 it is rated at a Torino scale of 0 with 1 in 38 million odds of impacting with Earth on March 27, 2026.

The 2023 approach will be visible to amateur astronomers with modest telescopes and telescopes equipped with an image sensor. From 20–24 March 2023 it will be visible in the constellation of Cancer.

Identification 
The discovery was carried out within the (Data-parallel detection of Solar System objects and space debris) ParaSOL project that is sponsored by UEFISCDI in Romania and led by Dr. Marcel Popescu. The new NEA was identified by Prof. Costin Boldea and by the STU ParaSOL software pipeline developed by the amateur astronomer Malin Stanescu. Other members of the EURONEAR collaboration who participated in the data analysis were Dr. Marian Predatu, and the amateur astronomers Lucian Curelaru and Daniel Bertesteanu.

Description 
 is approximately 50 to 100 meters (150 to 300 ft) in diameter and is listed on the Sentry Risk Table. It follows a rather eccentric (0.54), low-inclination (0.08°) orbit of 3.3 years duration, ranging between 0.99 and 3.40 AU from the Sun. It passes Earth on 25 March 2023 and then comes to perihelion (closest approach to the Sun) on 4 April 2023.

Possible impact 
Virtual clones of the asteroid that fit the uncertainty region in the known trajectory show a 1 in  chance that the asteroid could impact Earth on 2026 March 27, but the nominal approach (line of variation) has the asteroid  from Earth at the time of the potential impact. The asteroid is more likely to safely approach Earth around 4 April 2026, well after the potential impact scenario. It is estimated that an impact would produce an upper atmosphere air burst equivalent to 4.8 Mt TNT (15.1 PJ), roughly equal to 229 of the Fat Man warhead dropped on Nagasaki.

With an observation arc of 63 days it peaked at a Palermo scale rating of –1.17 with the odds of impact then being about 15 times less than the background hazard level.

The late April / early May 2029 approach is not an impact threat as the orbits only intersect in late March.

Notes

References

External links 
 
 
 

Minor planet object articles (unnumbered)
20230325
Potential impact events caused by near-Earth objects
20230227
EURONEAR